This is a list of amphibians and reptiles found in the Grenadines, a chain of over 600 small islands located in the Caribbean Lesser Antilles.  Politically, the northern two-thirds of the Grenadines are part of the nation Saint Vincent and the Grenadines; the remainder is part of Grenada.

Amphibians
There are two species of amphibian in the Grenadines, one of which was introduced.

Frogs (Anura)

Reptiles
Including marine turtles and introduced species, there are 19 reptile species reported in the Grenadines.

Turtles (Testudines)

Lizards and snakes (Squamata)

See also
List of amphibians and reptiles of Saint Vincent
List of amphibians and reptiles of Grenada

Notes

References
Note: All species listed above are supported by Malhotra & Thorpe 1999, unless otherwise cited.

.

 Amphibians Grenadines
Grenadines
Grenadines
 Grenadines